Blood Stain Child (stylised as BLOOD STAIN CHILD) is a Japanese melodic death metal band from the city of Osaka. The band's musical style combines melodic death metal with electronic and trance. The band formed under the name "Visionquest" in 1999, but changed their name to Blood Stain Child in 2000.

Background
Blood Stain Child, then called Visionquest, was formed in 1999 by Ryo (bass, lead vocals), Ryu (lead guitar, synth guitar), Daiki (rhythm guitar, synth guitar), Aki (keyboards, piano, synthesizers, backing vocals) and Violator (drums, percussion). In 2000, they took on their current name and recorded their first three-track demo in August 2000. The band sent that demo to a radio station and the DJ enjoyed the music so much that he recommended the band to the record label, M&I Company, who eventually signed Blood Stain Child.

In 2001, Blood Stain Child recorded two songs, "The World" and "Steel Flame". The first song was used as the theme song for professional wrestler, Kensuke Sasaki and the second song was used as the theme song for the 30th anniversary of New Japan Pro-Wrestling, a professional wrestling group. In July 2002, Blood Stain released their debut studio album, Silence of Northern Hell. In October 2002, Blood Stain Child was the supporting act for Dream Evil during their tour in Japan. In June 2003, Blood Stain Child released their second studio album, Mystic Your Heart, which was co-produced by Anssi Kippo, a popular producer from Finland.

In March 2005, Daiki left the band and was replaced by Shiromasa in April. That same year, Blood Stain Child released their third studio album, Idolator, which was co-produced by Tue Madsen, a popular producer from Denmark. In 2006, Blood Stain Child signed with Dockyard 1 and released Idolator in Europe on 27 November 2006. Idolator was later released in the United States through Locomotive Records on 17 July 2007.

In April 2007, Blood Stain Child announced the addition of a new vocalist, Sadew, and a new guitarist, G.S.R. On 18 July 2007, Blood Stain Child released their fourth studio album, Mozaiq in Japan, which was also co-produced by Tue Madsen. It was then released in Europe on 20 July 2007 with an exclusive bonus track "Cosmic Highway".

On 12 June 2010, Ryu announced on his official blog that Sadew withdrew from the band due to personal reasons. Drummer Violator left the band as well, in order to take care of family business. In September the band announced new members  (also known as Sophia Aslanidou, from Greece) on vocals and Gami (ex-Youthquake) on drums, signing a contract with Italian record label Coroner Records and Japanese record label Pony Canyon.

In April 2011, Blood Stain Child took part in a Studio Ghibli cover album titled Imaginary Flying Machines - Princess Ghibli, covering the songs "Itsumo Nando Demo" (Spirited Away) and "Teru no Uta" (Tales from Earthsea). In June 2011, the band performed at A-Kon in Dallas, Texas, together with D. Later that same month, the band released their fifth full studio album, Epsilon. The band started a Japanese tour from 19 August to 24 September. In December 2011, the band performed in Moscow, St. Petersburg, Ekaterinburg and Kiev.

Blood Stain Child performed as special guests at Naka-Kon 2012, in Overland Park, Kansas, between the 10–12 February. In March 2012, the band took part in another Princess Ghibli album, covering the song "Ai wa Hana Kimi wa Sonotane" (Only Yesterday). On 21 July, Sophia officially announced that she was leaving Blood Stain Child. She later formed the electronic metal band Season of Ghosts in 2013. New female vocalist Kiki joined the band on 3 December. In early 2013 the band introduced their new VJ/DJ - Makoto, which came along with an announcement of Aki being absent from further live shows due to "his personal issues", however, he will remain a member and take part in the creation of music. However, Makoto left in 2014.

Founding member Ryo and Kiki both left Blood Stain Child in 2016. They were replaced by bassist Yakky and male vocalist Saika, respectively.

In 2018, Blood Stain Child joined forces with Danceroid singer Yuzuki and created the melodic death metal supergroup Yuzukingdom.

On 1 February 2019, Blood Stain Child released a new single, entitled "Del-Sol" as well as an accompanying music video. Later that year, on 3 July, a new full-length album called Amateras was released featuring the same members as the previous single.

Musical style
A notable feature of Blood Stain Child is their tendency to incorporate both electro-industrial and euro-trance related themes and elements into their music. The band's sound includes screamed vocals complemented at times by traditional singing, with their overall musical style best classified as a mix between In Flames, Children of Bodom, and Soilwork. The band cites influences such as In Flames, Dark Tranquillity, HIM, X Japan, and Luna Sea.

Members
 Ryu – lead guitar, synth guitar (1999–present)
 Aki – keyboards, piano, synthesizers, backing vocals (1999–present, studio member since 2013)
 G.S.R – rhythm guitar, synth guitar (2007–present)
 Sadew – lead vocals (2007–2010, 2018–present)
 Yakky – bass (2016–present)
 Yasu – drums, percussion (2018–present)

Former members
 Daiki – rhythm guitar, synth guitar (1999–2005)
 Violator – drums, percussion (1999–2010)
 Ryo – bass, lead vocals (1999–2016), backing vocals (1999–2007)
 Shiromasa – rhythm guitar, synth guitar (2005–2007)
 Sophia Aslanides – lead vocals (2010–2012)
 Gami – drums, percussion (2010–2018)
 Kiki – lead vocals (2012–2016)
 Makoto – DJ, VJ, manipulator (2013–2014)
 Saika – lead vocals (2016–2018)

Timeline

Discography
Demos, EPs and Singles
 Demo 2000 (2000)
 The World (2001)
 Last Stardust (2014)
 Nexus (2016)
 Tri Odyssey (2017)
 Del-SOl (2019)
 2045 (2021)
 共鳴領域 (with Pizuya's Cell, 2022)

Albums
 Silence of Northern Hell (2002)
 Mystic Your Heart (2003)
 Idolator (2005)
 mozaiq (2007)
 εpsilon (2011)
 The Legend (Best of-album, 2018)
 Amateras (2019)

Music videos
 "Silence of Northern Hell" from Silence of Northern Hell
 "Truth" from Idolator
 "Freedom" from mozaiq
 "Last Stardust" from Last Stardust EP
 "Nexus" from Nexus EP
 "Tri Odyssey" from Tri Odyssey EP
 "Trance Dead Kingdom" from Tri Odyssey EP
 "gaia evolution" from Tri Odyssey EP
 "KAMUI-神威-" from The Legend
 "Del-Sol" from Amateras
 "皇～sumeragi～" from Amateras

References

External links
 Official website
 Official MySpace
 Ryu's blog
 Ryo's blog

Pony Canyon artists
Japanese melodic death metal musical groups
Electro-industrial music groups
Musical groups from Osaka
Musical groups established in 1999
Locomotive Music artists
Metal Blade Records artists
1999 establishments in Japan